Lophocampa tucumana is a moth of the family Erebidae. It was described by Rothschild in 1909. It is found in Argentina.

References

 Natural History Museum Lepidoptera generic names catalog

tucumana
Moths described in 1909